The kelp pipefish (Syngnathus californiensis) is a species of the pipefish. It inhabits the eastern Pacific from the Bodega Bay in northern California, United States, to southern Baja California, Mexico. It is a marine subtropical demersal fish, up to  length.

References 

kelp pipefish
Fish of the Western United States
Fish of Mexican Pacific coast
Western North American coastal fauna
Fauna of California
Taxa named by David Humphreys Storer
kelp pipefish